Moriches is a hamlet and census-designated place (CDP) in the Suffolk County town of Brookhaven, New York, United States. The population was 2,838 at the 2010 census.

History
The name "Moriches" comes from Meritces, a Native American who owned land on Moriches Neck.

One of the community's most notable businesses/landmarks was the Jurgielewicz Duck Farm founded in 1919 on the edge of the Forge River. At its peak, the  farm located on the edge of the Montauk Branch of the Long Island Rail Road claimed to be America's largest free-range duck operation, raising one million Pekin ducks per year. In 2011, it declared bankruptcy, and it closed in August of that year.

Geography

Demographics

Demographics of the CDP
As of the census of 2000, there were 2,319 people, 1,116 households, and 669 families residing in the CDP. The population density was 1,190.6 per square mile (459.2/km2). There were 1,212 housing units at an average density of 622.3/sq mi (240.0/km2). The racial makeup of the CDP was 94.91% White, 1.25% African American, 0.13% Native American, 1.81% Asian, 0.65% from other races, and 1.25% from two or more races. Hispanic or Latino of any race were 3.97% of the population.

There were 1,116 households, out of which 13.9% had children under the age of 18 living with them, 52.1% were married couples living together, 5.5% had a female householder with no husband present, and 40.0% were non-families. 30.9% of all households were made up of individuals, and 10.5% had someone living alone who was 65 years of age or older. The average household size was 2.05 and the average family size was 2.56.

In the CDP, the population was spread out, with 11.5% under the age of 18, 6.4% from 18 to 24, 31.4% from 25 to 44, 27.5% from 45 to 64, and 23.2% who were 65 years of age or older. The median age was 46 years. For every 100 females, there were 100.8 males. For every 100 females age 18 and over, there were 99.8 males.

The median income for a household in the CDP was $63,672, and the median income for a family was $74,659. Males had a median income of $51,205 versus $35,950 for females. The per capita income for the CDP was $34,038. About 2.9% of families and 5.5% of the population were below the poverty threshold, including 6.4% of those under age 18 and 6.7% of those age 65 or over.

Education
Moriches is served by the William Floyd School District.

See also 
 Moriches Bay
 Moriches Inlet
 Outer Barrier

References

Brookhaven, New York
Hamlets in New York (state)
Census-designated places in New York (state)
Census-designated places in Suffolk County, New York
Hamlets in Suffolk County, New York
Populated coastal places in New York (state)